Crystal Creek is a town located in north-eastern New South Wales, Australia, in the Tweed Shire.

Demographics

The median age of the Crystal Creek population was 44 years, six years above the national median of 38.

84.3% of people living in Crystal Creek were born in Australia. The other top responses for country of birth were Germany 2.7%, Netherlands 1.6%, Italy 1.2%, United Arab Emirates 1.2% and India 1.2%.

89.3% of people spoke only English at home; the only other response for language spoken at home was German 3.1%.

References 

Suburbs of Tweed Heads, New South Wales